Ramiro Ezequiel Arias (born 6 January 1993) is an Argentine footballer who currently plays for Villa Dálmine, as a left-back.

Career
He made his senior debut in Primera División for San Lorenzo on March 9, 2014, against Godoy Cruz.

References

1993 births
Living people
Association football defenders
Argentine footballers
People from Trelew
Argentine Primera División players
Primera Nacional players
San Lorenzo de Almagro footballers
Aldosivi footballers
Club Atlético Sarmiento footballers
Club Almagro players
Instituto footballers
Villa Dálmine footballers